The 2012–13 season was Damash's 3rd season in the Pro League, and their 2nd consecutive season in the top division of Iranian football and 5th year in existence as a football club. They competed in the Hazfi Cup. Damash was captained by Mohammad Reza Mahdavi.

Player

First team squad
Updated 12 June 2013

This player changed his last name from Boroush to Soroushnia in December 2012*.

Transfers 
Confirmed transfers 2012–13

In:

Out:

In:

Out:

Competitions

Overview

Iran Pro League

Standings

Results summary

Results by round

Matches

Hazfi Cup

Matches

Squad statistics

Appearances & goals
Last updated 12 January 2013

|-
|colspan="12"|Players who are no longer playing for Damash or who have been loaned out:

|}

Top scorers
Includes all competitive matches. The list is sorted by squad number when total goals are equal.

Last updated on 5 June 2013

Coaching staff

See also
 2012–13 Persian Gulf Cup
 2012–13 Hazfi Cup

References

External links
Iran Premier League Statistics
Persian League

Damash Gilan seasons
Damash